Thomas Dunne (12 November 1906 – 15 February 1983) was an Australian rules footballer who played with Richmond and North Melbourne in the Victorian Football League (VFL).

Originally from Kerang, Dunne was a defender during his league career. He was on a half back flank in the 1929 VFL Grand Final, which Richmond lost to Collingwood. Despite not playing a game in the 1931 home and away season, he came into the side for the semi final, replacing Maurie Sheahan at centre half-back. He remained in that position for the 1931 VFL Grand Final but again finished on the losing team.

References

External links

1906 births
1983 deaths
Australian rules footballers from Victoria (Australia)
Richmond Football Club players
North Melbourne Football Club players